Kolonjë is a small village in Gjirokastër County, southern Albania, located northwest of the city Gjirokastër which is about 30 minutes away. At the 2015 local government reform it became part of the municipality Gjirokastër. The village is inhabited by Muslim Albanians. The village has a festival every year on 10 May called Dhjet Maj, when everyone who has left the village returns to celebrate with the villagers. It is also attended by people from other villages.

References

Populated places in Gjirokastër
Villages in Gjirokastër County